Gilbert Melki (born 12 November 1958) is a French actor.

Life and career
Nephew of actor Claude Melki (The Acrobat), Melki grew up in a Jewish family from Algeria. His father, an antiques dealer, came from Khenchela in Algeria and his mother was from France. Both hid during the World War II: his father in Lyon and his mother in Normandy.

His father sent him to a woodworking school, but Melki only stayed a few months. At 20 he decided to move towards comedy and took multiple drama classes. Fearful of not being up to par he went to live for several years in Italy.

After a first appearance on screen in 1992 in the Claude Chabrol film Betty, Gilbert Melki rose to prominence in 1996 through Would I Lie To You? by Thomas Gilou in which he played Patrick Abitbol, a great businessman and millionaire megalomaniac, a role he revisited in the sequel in 2001.

His later films include the 2005 film Crustacés et Coquillages. In 2012, he moved to television with the Canal+ comedy series Kaboul Kitchen.

Filmography
1992
 Betty by Claude Chabrol
1997
 La Vérité si je mens ! by Thomas Gilou
 Un amour de sorcière by René Manzor
 Une journée de merde by Miguel Courtois
1998
  by 
 La Patinoire by Jean-Philippe Toussaint
 Grève party by Fabien Onteniente
1999
 Chili con carne by Thomas Gilou
 Monsieur Naphtali by Olivier Schatzky
 Vénus beauté (institut) by Tonie Marshall
2000
 On fait comme on a dit by Philippe Berenger
 La Taule by Alain Robak
2001
 A Hell of a Day by Marion Vernoux
  by Antoine de Caunes
 La Vérité si je mens ! 2 by Thomas Gilou
2002
 Un couple épatant by Lucas Belvaux
 Cavale by Lucas Belvaux
 Après la vie by Lucas Belvaux
 Au plus près du paradis by Tonie Marshall
2003
 Monsieur Ibrahim et les fleurs du Coran by François Dupeyron
 Rencontre avec le dragon by Hélène Angel
2004
 Les Temps qui changent (Changing Times) by André Téchiné
 Prendre femme by Ronit Elkabetz and Shlomi Elkabetz
 Incautos by Miguel Bardem
 Confidences trop intimes (Intimate Strangers) by Patrice Leconte
2005
 Angel-A by Luc Besson
 Palais Royal by Valérie Lemercier
2006
 Crustacés et coquillages (Cockles and Muscles) by Olivier Ducastel and Jacques Martineau
 Ça brûle by Claire Simon
 La Raison du plus faible by Lucas Belvaux
 Mr. Average
2007
 Le Deuxième Souffle by Alain Corneau
 Anna M. by Michel Spinosa
 Très bien, merci by Emmanuelle Cuau
 Cowboy by Benoît Mariage
 Le Tueur by Cédric Anger
2008
 Made in Italy by Stéphane Giusti
 Largo Winch by Jérôme Salle
2009
 Accomplices by Frédéric Mermoud
2010
 Le Mac by Pascal Bourdiaux
 L’Avocat by Cédric Anger
2012
 La vérité si je mens ! 3 by Thomas Gilou
2016
 Vendeur by Sylvain Desclous
2019
 Le Bazar de la Charité by Alexandre Laurent

References

External links

1968 births
Living people
French male film actors
French male television actors
French people of Algerian descent
Male actors from Paris
Jewish French male actors
20th-century French male actors
21st-century French male actors